Beyamlu (also Romanized as Beyāmlū) is a village in Mah Neshan Rural District, in the Central District of Mahneshan County, Zanjan Province, Iran. At the 2006 census, its population was 20, in 5 families.

References 

Populated places in Mahneshan County